TAN Books is a traditionalist Catholic American book distributor and publisher.

History
TAN Books was founded in 1967, as "TAN Books and Publishers," in Rockford, Illinois by Thomas A. Nelson (not to be confused with the founder of the Bible-publishing firm Thomas Nelson) to keep in print books teaching the traditional Catholic faith in the wake of the Second Vatican Council.

TAN was subsequently acquired by Saint Benedict Press in 2008.

Criticism and legal troubles

Baronius Press, Ltd. v. Saint Benedict Press, LLC (2016–2019)
On September 29, 2016, Baronius Press, a British publisher of traditional Catholic books, filed a civil lawsuit against TAN Books and Saint Benedict Press. The lawsuit alleged that TAN had violated Baronius's ownership of the copyright for the English translation of Ludwig Ott's Fundamentals of Catholic Dogma (Grundriß der katholischen Dogmatik in the original German). Baronius Press purchased the exclusive rights to the English translation from the original copyright holders in 2009, and obtained an exclusive license with the underlying owner of the German original in 2011. The English translation of Fundamentals had been in the public domain in the United States since its initial publication in 1954, as U.S. copyright law did not provide automatic copyright protection to works initially published in foreign countries (the English translation of Fundamentals was originally published in Ireland).

Imprints
 TAN Books: Publishes reprints of classic Catholic works on theology, Scripture, traditional devotions, the Tridentine Mass, and lives of the saints, as well as new titles on these subjects by contemporary authors and a line of newly-typeset Douay–Rheims Bibles (co-branded with Saint Benedict Press). In addition, the former "Saint Benedict Press Classics" series is now marketed under the "TAN Classics" moniker. TAN has also, in recent years, published resources aimed toward Catholic homeschooling families; the company has also released a line of audiobooks for some of its new and classic titles.
 Confraternity of the Precious Blood: TAN currently serves as the distributor of titles issued by the Confraternity (associated with the Brooklyn-based Sisters Adorers of the Precious Blood), including My Daily Bread, My Imitation of Christ, My Daily Psalm Book, and Christ in the Gospel.
 Neumann Press: Acquired by TAN Books in 2013, Neumann Press republishes classic Catholic children's works, history books, and novels aimed at students from primary to secondary school.
 American Chesterton Society: Since May 2015, TAN Books has been the exclusive distributor of works published by the Society, which specializes in contemporary titles written in the tradition of Catholic philosopher G. K. Chesterton.

See also
List of book distributors

References

External links
TAN Books website

Book publishing companies based in North Carolina
Catholic publishing companies
Catholic media
Christian publishing companies
Publishing companies established in 1967
1967 establishments in Illinois
Book distributors
Traditionalist Catholicism